Tales from Northumberland with Robson Green is a British documentary series which sees Robson Green travel around his home county of Northumberland in the North of England.

Transmissions
Tales from Northumberland 

Tales from the Coast

Episodes
Series 1
The first series aired from 28 October until 16 December 2013.

Series 2
The second series aired from 16 February until 6 April 2015. The series was titled More Tales from Northumberland with Robson Green.

Series 3
The third series began airing on 29 February 2016 and was titled Further Tales from Northumberland with Robson Green.

Tales from the Coast with Robson Green

DVD release
The Region 2 DVD for the first series was released on 6 January 2014.

References

External links
Official Twitter

2013 British television series debuts
2017 British television series endings
2010s British documentary television series
English-language television shows
ITV documentaries
Television series by ITV Studios
Television shows set in Northumberland